Fanuatapu, an uninhabited island, is a volcanic tuff ring off the eastern tip of Upolu Island, Samoa. It is the smallest and easternmost of the four Aleipata Islands, with an area of 15 hectares. It has an automated lighthouse.

See also

 Samoa Islands
 List of islands
 Desert island

References
  (includes Fanuatapu)

Uninhabited islands of Samoa
Volcanoes of Samoa
Tuff cones
Atua (district)